The Grumman G-44 Widgeon is a small, five-person, twin-engined, amphibious aircraft. It was designated J4F by the United States Navy and Coast Guard and OA-14 by the United States Army Air Corps and United States Army Air Forces.

Design and development
The Widgeon was originally designed for the civil market. It is smaller, but otherwise similar to Grumman's earlier G-21 Goose, and was produced from 1941 to 1955. The aircraft was used during World War II as a small patrol and utility machine by the US Navy, US Coast Guard, and Royal Navy's Fleet Air Arm.

The first prototype flew in 1940, and the first production aircraft went to the US Navy as an antisubmarine aircraft. In total, 276 were built by Grumman, including 176 for the military. During World War II, they served with the US Navy, Coast Guard, Civil Air Patrol, and Army Air Force, as well as with the British Royal Navy, which gave it the service name Gosling.

Operational history

United States Coast Guard

On August 1, 1942, a J4F-1 flown by US Coast Guard Patrol Squadron 212 based out of Houma, Louisiana, and flown by Chief Aviation Pilot Henry White, spotted and attacked a German U-boat off the coast of Louisiana.  White reported the submarine sunk, and he was subsequently credited with sinking  and awarded the Distinguished Flying Cross.

However, in June 2001 the wreck of U-166 was found sitting near the  wreck of SS Robert E. Lee  by an oil exploration team; and the sinking of U-166 on July 30 (i.e. two days before the Widgeon flight) is now credited to patrol craft PC-566 escorting the Robert E. Lee.

White's Widgeon is now thought to have made an unsuccessful attack against , a Type IXC U-boat identical to U-166 that reported an air attack coincident with White's attack. U-171 was undamaged by White's attack, but was sunk four months later in the Bay of Biscay.

Civil Air Patrol
The sinking of a German U-boat by the Civil Air Patrol (CAP) was claimed by one of their larger aircraft on 11 July 1942. The Grumman G-44 Widgeon, armed with two depth charges and crewed by Captain Johnny Haggins and Major Wynant Farr, was scrambled when another CAP patrol radioed that they had encountered an enemy submarine, but were returning to base due to low fuel. After scanning the area, Farr spotted the U-boat cruising beneath the surface of the waves. Unable to accurately determine the depth of the vessel, Haggins and Ferr radioed the situation back to base and followed the enemy in hopes that it would rise to periscope depth. For three hours, the crew shadowed the submarine. Farr released one of the two depth charges, blowing the submarine's front out of the water. As it left an oil slick, Farr made a second pass and released the other charge. Debris appeared on the ocean's surface, confirming the U-boat's demise and the CAP's first kill.

Postwar operations

After the war, Grumman redesigned the aircraft to make it more suitable for civilian operations. A new hull improved its water handling, and six seats were installed. In total, 76 of the new G-44As were built by Grumman, the last being delivered on January 13, 1949. Most of these ended up in the United States.

McKinnon Enterprises at Sandy, Oregon, converted over 70 Widgeons to "Super Widgeons". The conversion features replacing the engines with  Avco Lycoming GO-480-B1D flat-six piston engines, and various other modifications, including modern avionics, three-bladed propellers, larger windows, improved soundproofing, emergency exits, and increased maximum takeoff weight. Retractable wingtip floats were optional.

Variants

G-44
Main production variant, 200 built (serial nos. 1201–1400) including J4F series military variants listed below.

G-44A
Improved postwar production variant with redesigned hull, 76 built (serial nos. 1401–1476.)
J4F-1
G-44 for the United States Coast Guard with three seats, 25 built.
J4F-2
United States Navy version of the J4F-1 with 5-seat interior, 131 built.

OA-14
Fifteen G-44s impressed into wartime service with the United States Army Air Forces.
OA-14A
One new aircraft for the Corps of Engineers.
Gosling I
Fifteen J4F-2s transferred to the Royal Navy, later renamed Widgeon I

SCAN 30
G-44A Licence-built in France using Metric standards and not Anodized as were original Grumman-built aircraft, 41 built (serial nos. 1–41.)
PACE Gannet
Pacific Aerospace Engineering Corporation conversions of S.C.A.N. 30s, powered by  Lycoming R-680-13 radial engines. Later known as the Gannet Super Widgeon

Operators

Military operators

Brazilian Air Force operated 14 from 1942 to 1958

Cuban Navy received four in 1952

 Israeli Air Force operated two from 1948 to 1949

 Portuguese Navy operated 12 from 1942 to 1968

Royal Thai Navy operated five in 1951
Royal Thai Air Force operated five from 1951 to 1956

 Royal Navy Fleet Air Arm

 United States Army Air Corps
 United States Army Air Forces
 United States Coast Guard
 United States Navy
 Civil Air Patrol

 Uruguayan Navy operated one example from 1943 to 1979

Civil operators

Mørefly

Mount Cook Airline

Surviving aircraft

Brazil
 1290 – UC-4F2 on static display at the Museu Aeroespacial in Rio de Janeiro.

Canada
 28 – SCAN-30 airworthy with Mark Williston of Delta, British Columbia.

Portugal
 120 – G-44 on static display at the Navy Museum in Lisbon.
 129 – G-44 on static display at the Museu do Ar in Sintra, Lisbon.

Thailand
 1449 – G-44A on static display at the Royal Thai Air Force Museum in Bangkok.

United States
 31 – SCAN 30 airworthy with Orlando Financial Corporation in Bear, Delaware. It was used as De plane! De plane! in the television show Fantasy Island where it delivered guests to the island and was put up for at auction in April 2016.
 1312 – G-44 on display at the Alaska Aviation Museum in Anchorage, Alaska.
 32976 – J4F-2 on static display at the Pima Air & Space Museum in Tucson, Arizona.
 V212 – J4F-1 on static display at the National Naval Aviation Museum in Pensacola, Florida.

Specifications (G-44)

See also

References
Notes

Bibliography

 Donald, David. The Complete Encyclopedia of World Aircraft. New York: Barnes & Noble Books, 1997. .
 Green, William. War Planes of the Second World War: Volume Five; Flying Boats. London: Macdonald, 1968. .
 Taylor, John W. R. Jane's All The World's Aircraft 1976–77. London: Jane's Yearbooks, 1976. .

External links

 Grumman Widgeon Owners Group
 Fleet Air Arm: Grumman J4F Widgeon
 Grumman Widgeon

Widgeon
1940s United States civil utility aircraft
Flying boats
Amphibious aircraft
High-wing aircraft
Aircraft first flown in 1940
Twin piston-engined tractor aircraft